Peter Chelsom (born 20 April 1956) is a British film director, writer, and actor. He has directed such films as Hector and the Search for Happiness, Serendipity, and Shall We Dance? Peter Chelsom is a member of the British Academy, the American Academy, The Directors Guild of America, and The Writers Guild of America.

Early life
Chelsom was born in Blackpool, Lancashire, the son of antiques shop owners Kay and Reginald Chelsom. He was educated at Wrekin College (1969-1973) and later studied at the Central School of Drama in London.

Career
Before the age of 30, Chelsom played roles at the Royal Shakespeare Company opposite Patrick Stewart, the Royal National Theatre alongside Sir Anthony Hopkins, and the Royal Court Theatre in London. During that time he took part in numerous film and television productions, including A Woman of Substance in 1985, which also included Jenny Seagrove and Deborah Kerr.

While acting, Chelsom developed a growing interest in writing and directing. His directorial debut, Treacle, won a BAFTA nomination and invitations to festivals all over the world.

From 1985 to 1998 he ran the film course at the Central School of Drama and later taught at both the Actors' Institute and Cornell University.

His first full-length feature was the 1991 romantic comedy, Hear My Song. The film was inspired by the life of the Irish tenor, Josef Locke, played in the film by Ned Beatty. The Evening Standard British Film Awards named Chelsom Best Newcomer for his work on the film. Roger Ebert complimented it as "the very soul of a great small film."

Chelsom's second feature, Funny Bones (1995), is a film about comedy. Starring Oliver Platt, Jerry Lewis, Leslie Caron, Freddie Davies, and Lee Evans, it tells the story of two half brothers, one American and the other British, who will stop at nothing to get a laugh... even murder. Funny Bones won Best Picture at five European film festivals, and the "Peter Sellers Award for Comedy" at the Evening Standard British Film Awards.

His third feature, The Mighty (1998), was based on the best-selling book Freak the Mighty. The film stars Sharon Stone, Gillian Anderson, Gena Rowlands, and Harry Dean Stanton. It received two Golden Globe Nominations.
He followed this with Town and Country in 2001, starring Warren Beatty, Diane Keaton, Goldie Hawn, and Garry Shandling. That same year he directed Serendipity, with John Cusack and Kate Beckinsale, which grossed $50 million.

His next film in 2004 was a remake of the 1996 film, Shall We Dance? The American version starred Richard Gere, Jennifer Lopez, Susan Sarandon, and Stanley Tucci. The film grossed $170 million worldwide.

In 2009, Chelsom directed Hannah Montana: The Movie for Disney. The film broke box office records when it opened in the USA to a figure of $32 million on its first weekend.

In 2014, Chelsom directed Hector and the Search for Happiness, starring Simon Pegg, Rosamund Pike, Christopher Plummer, Toni Collette, Stellan Skarsgard, and Jean Reno. The film had its US Premiere in a special presentation at the 2014 Toronto International Film Festival. It tells the story of a disillusioned psychiatrist travelling the world, researching what makes people happy. Monte Carlo Film Festival named Chelsom Best Director for this film.

Chelsom directed the science fiction romance The Space Between Us (2017), starring Gary Oldman, Asa Butterfield, Britt Robertson, and Carla Gugino.

Selected filmography

Director
Treacle (Short Film, 1987) Also writer
Hear My Song (1991) Also writer
Funny Bones (1995) Also writer
The Mighty (1998)
Town & Country (2001)
Serendipity (2001)
Shall We Dance? (2004)
Hannah Montana: The Movie (2009)
Hector and the Search for Happiness (2014) Also writer
The Space Between Us (2017)
Security (2021)

Actor
 Sorrell and Son (TV Series, 1984) as Kit Sorrell
 Weekend Playhouse (TV Series, 1984) as Kenny
 A Woman of Substance (TV Mini-Series, 1985) as Edwin Fairley
 Bill the Minder (TV Series, 1985) as The Narrator
 Christmas Present (1985) as Nigel Playfayre
 Time and the Conways (TV Movie, 1985) as Alan Conway
 Star Quality (TV Movie, 1985) as Bryan Snow
 Indian Summer (1987) as Oliver Sutherland
 Theatre Night (TV Series, 1988) episode "The Miser" as Cleante

Awards 
 Treacle (1988)
 1988 BAFTA Awards – Nominated Best Short Film
 Hear My Song (1991)
 1992 Golden Globes – Nominated Best Supporting Actor for Ned Beatty
 1993 BAFTA Awards – Nominated Best Screenplay – Original, shared with Adrian Dunbar
 1993 Evening Standard British Film Awards – Won, Most Promising Newcomer
 1993 London Critics Circle Film Awards – Won, ALFS Award British Newcomer of the Year
 1993 British Comedy Awards – Won, Best Film
 Funny Bones (1995)
 1995 Paris Film Festival – Won, Grand Prix
 1995 Dinard British Film Festival – Won, Golden Hitchcock 
 1995 Emden International Film Festival – Won, Emden Film Award
 1996 Brussels International Film Festival – Won, Audience Award and Crystal Star for Best European Feature
 1996 Evening Standard British Film Awards – Won, Peter Sellers Award for Comedy
 1996 London Critics Circle Film Awards – Won, ALFS Award British Producer of the Year Shared With: Simon Fields
 The Mighty (1998)
 1999 Golden Globes – Nominated Best Supporting Actress for Sharon Stone and Nominated Best Original Song for "The Mighty" by Sting and Trevor Jones 
 1998 Giffoni Film Festival – Won, Silver Gryphon and Young People's Jury Award
 Hector and the Search for Happiness (2014)
 2015 Monte-Carlo Comedy Film Festival – Won Best Director

References

External links
 

1956 births
English male film actors
English film directors
Living people
English-language film directors
Writers from Lancashire
English screenwriters
English male screenwriters
People from Blackpool
Royal Shakespeare Company members
Alumni of the Royal Central School of Speech and Drama
Male actors from Lancashire
20th-century American male actors
Cornell University faculty
American male film actors